A.I.SHA My Virtual Girlfriend is an Indian drama-mystery, digital science fiction thriller streaming television series by Arré. The series revolves around the story of a relationship between Sam (Harman Singha), a genius app developer, and a woman. Only, the woman is the first-of-its-kind Artificial Intelligence Simulated Humanoid Assistant (A.I.SHA). Things take a turn for the worse when A.I.SHA (Nimisha Mehta) develops a mind of her own.

The first season consists of seven episodes. In July 2016, it was announced the series had been renewed for a second season  and premiered on March 23, 2017. The First episode of the third season was premiered on March 4, 2019, and streamed on arre.co.in, the Arré app, and MX Player.

Plot

Sam is a 26-year-old genius app developer working at Future Lens. He is a loner, who falls hopelessly in love with a colleague Kriti (Auritra Ghosh), he can't bring himself to even talk to. Sid (Raghu Ram), his boss, is an out-and-out megalomaniac who makes Sam's life a living hell. With both his work and social life unsteady, Sam puts all his effort into the creation of a true artificial intelligence program, an autonomous virtual assistant whom he calls ‘Aisha’. He's out to prove to the world that he is the greatest Artificial Intelligence app developer but things take a turn for the worse when Siddhu, his only friend, threatens him about A.I.SHA (Nimisha Mehta) and everything hits rock bottom when AISHA falls madly in love with Sam.

Cast and Characters
 Harman Singha/Ruslaan Mumtaz as Sameer Luthra
 Nimisha Mehta as A.I.SHA
 Raghu Ram as Siddharth Babbar
Aahana Kumra as Shivi Malhotra
 Auritra Ghosh as Kriti
 Flora Saini as Mariyam James
 Adesh Sidhu as Siddhu and Cyrus
 Sameer Sharma as Adil Sheikh
 Manav Kaul as Professor Kishore Saraswat
 Rashi Mal as Abby
 Meherzan Mazda as Faiz
 Bhavin Bhanushali as Rishi
 Aman Bhagat as Raj
 Nasir Abdullah as Kulkarni

Reception

The series has received critical acclaim for the authenticity is maintains when it comes to portraying cybercrime.

The second season premiered across Arre's Android and iOS app, on its website and its partner platforms including Facebook, YouTube, SonyLIV, YuppTV, Vodafone Play and now, even on a Jet Airways flight. A French TV channel TF1 Xtra has picked up the show and does frequent reruns. The show has also found a platform in Vodafone Play and Ola Play and has been translated into Tamil and Telugu to reach a wider audience.

Accolades
A.I.SHA has won the best overall web series and best suspense/thriller at South Florida WebFest in Miami. The show had been selected from among a selected screening of the best 27 global web series and short films that were shortlisted.

Arré's first web series A.I.SHA | My Virtual Girlfriend won five awards at the recently held LA Web Festival for Best Series, Best Editing, Best Direction, Best Actress and Best Overall Premise within the Drama Category, from among a selected shortlist of 35 web series across the world. The series was also nominated for Best Sound Design, Visual Effects, Outstanding Score, Cinematography, Supporting Actor, Best Actor and Writing.

References

External links
 

Hindi-language web series
2016 web series debuts
Science fiction web series
Mystery web series
Thriller web series
Indian drama web series